Vagner Giovani "Geovane" Fernández (born July 21, 1982 in Río Branco, Uruguay) is a Uruguayan racing cyclist. In 2015, Fernández won the Uruguayan National Road Race Championships.

Major results

2003
 1st Overall Volta Ciclistica de Porto Alegre
1st Stage 3
2005
 9th Overall Vuelta del Uruguay
2006
 3rd Overall Vuelta al Chana
 7th Overall Vuelta Ciclista de Chile
2007
 1st Suarez
2008
 Vuelta al Chana
1st Stages 1 & 2
 2nd Overall Rutas del Este
1st Stage 2
 3rd Overall Día de las Americas
2009
 7th Overall Rutas de América
2010
 8th Overall Vuelta del Uruguay
2015
 1st  Road race, National Road Championships

References

External links

1982 births
Living people
People from Río Branco, Uruguay
Uruguayan people of Spanish descent
Uruguayan male cyclists